Rosewood (formerly, Stumpville) is an unincorporated community in Humboldt County, California. It is located 1 mi (1.6 km) south of Eureka, at an elevation of 131 feet (40 m).

The Stumpville post office opened in 1930, changed its name to Rosewood in 1941, and closed for good in 1955. The entire area became part of unincorporated Eureka, California

References

Eureka, California
Unincorporated communities in Humboldt County, California
Unincorporated communities in California